Baringo County is one of the 47 counties in Kenya. It is located in the former Rift Valley Province. Its headquarters and largest town is Kabarnet. The county is home to Lake Baringo.

Geographical location

Baringo bounded by Turkana County and West Pokot County to the North, Samburu County and Laikipia County to the East, Nakuru County and Kericho County to the South, Uasin Gishu County to the South West and Elgeyo Marakwet County to the West. It covers an area of 8,655 km2. Baringo County lies between Latitudes 00 degrees 13" South and 1
degree 40" north and Longitudes 35 degrees 36" and 36" degrees 30" East.

Administrative and political units 
Baringo has seven administrative sub-counties

 Baringo Central
 Tiaty East
 Tiaty West
 Eldama Ravine
 Baringo South
 Mogotio
 Baringo North 

Eldama Ravine and Mogotio sub counties combined was formerly Koibatek District*

Administrative and electoral units in Baringo County 
Baringo county has a total of thirty electoral wards and one hundred and sixteen locations. The electoral wards is run by an elected member of county assembly where-areas location is led by Chief appointed.

Source

Demographics 

Distribution of population by sex and sub-county 

Source

Religion and ethnicities

The county is largely occupied by the Tugen and Pokot people, which are subtribes of the Kalenjin people. The Tugen people include the Aror, Samor, Torois, Keben, Kakimor, Bokor, Lembus, Chapchap and the Sachek of Sacho. Other communities residing in Baringo County include the Ilchamus, Turkana, Kikuyu, Numbians, and others. Christianity is the most practiced religion in the county. Traditionally, Baringo people believed in a Supreme Being known as Asis, who is represented by the sun; however, currently, most individuals in the county believe in Christianity. The well-known Christian denominations within Baringo County include the African Inland Church (AIC), Anglican Church of Kenya(ACK),  FGCK and Roman Catholic.

County government

The current County Governor is Benjamin Chesire Cheboi, the deputy governor is Eng. Felix Kipngo'k who is the eldest son of the former deputy governor Charles Kipng'ok who collapsed and died on September 14, 2022 at Jomo Kenyatta International Airport while boarding a plane to Mombasa; barely a month after taking oath of office. 
The current Senator is William Kipkorir Cheptumo after overwhelmingly defeating the former senator Gideon Moi on August 9 polls. The current County Women Representative is Flowrence Jematiah Sergon. 
The County Executive Committee  consists of the following: 

Other CEC Positions shall be updated by Ruzeki once they are filled.

Economics
The economy of the county is mainly agro-based. The main food crops grown are maize, pigeon peas, beans, Irish potatoes, sweet potatoes, sorghum, cassava and finger millet while the cash crops are coffee, cotton, macadamia and pyrethrum. Livestock products include honey, beef, mutton as well as hides and skins. However, little value addition is done to these products.

Urbanization

Major urban centres in the county are Kabarnet, Eldama Ravine, Marigat, Mogotio, Kabartonjo, Chemolingot and Tangulbei.

Tourism and wildlife

Major attractions include:

 Lake Bogoria and Kapedo Hotsprings
 Lake Bogoria Game Reserve is home to rare kudus, antelopes, zebras, leopards, cheetahs, hyenas, mongoose, monkeys, baboons and jackals. At the shores of Lake Bogoria are more than two millions lesser flamingoes and 350 bird species total.
 Lake Baringo
 Lake Baringo Snake Park has many snake species such as the black mamba, puff adder, boomslang and spitting cobra, monitor lizards, crocodiles and tortoises.
 Lake Kamnarok
 Kabarnet National Museum and Kipsaraman Community Museum
 Ruko Conservancy
 Cheploch Gorge

Major tourist hotels in the county are:
 Sunmaya Resort and World Trail Camps, Ainobmoi
 Lake Bogoria Hotel and Spa Resort
 Kabarnet Hotel, Kabarnet
 Sinkoro Hotel Ltd, Kabarnet
 Soi Safari Lodge
 Sportsline Hotel, Kabarnet
 Taidy's Restaurant, Eldama Ravine
 Kibelion Hotel, Emining
 Lalwa Safari Lodge, Koriema

Education

Kabarnet town hosts a number of university campuses including those of Baringo University, Mount Kenya University, Egerton University, and Kisii University.

Secondary schools include Kabarnet High School,solian girls, Baringo High School, Kapropita High School, and Kituro High School, Tabagon Girls, Pemwai Girls, Tenges Boys among others

There are six hundred and eighty seven primary schools, out of this 601 are public and 86 are private schools. In Secondary school category they are a total of one hundred and fifty nine (159) schools; one hundred and forty seven being public secondary schools and twelve being private public secondary schools.

Health

Kabarnet County Referral Hospital is the largest and best public hospital in the county. There are a total of 172 health facilities; seven level four, 25 level three and 140 level 2 centres.

Transport and infrastructure
The county headquarters is linked to Nakuru and Eldoret by class C roads which fall under the Kenya National Highways Authority (KENHA).

In January 2016, Fly-SAX began twice-weekly flights between Lake Baringo Airport and Nairobi–Wilson, becoming the first airline to serve the airport.

There are 339 km bitumen, 2141 murram and 995 km earth roads in the county. As at 2014 a total of 9 postal offices were spread across the county with letter boxes of 2950 installed, 2510 rented and 440 vacant.

Constituencies
The county has six constituencies: Baringo Central, Baringo South, Baringo North, Eldama Ravine, Mogotio, and Tiaty.

Villages and settlements

References

External links
https://web.archive.org/web/20181126221543/https://www.findingkenya.com/baringo-county
https://web.archive.org/web/20130511020558/https://opendata.go.ke/facet/counties/Baringo
https://web.archive.org/web/20140322145500/http://baringo-county.kbo.co.ke/
http://www.aridland.go.ke/districts.asp?DistrictID=8 
http://www.reliefweb.int/rw/RWB.NSF/db900SID/VBOL-6TNC5G?OpenDocument
Map of the District
Baringo County
32 Best Places to See in Baringo County - Finding Kenya Travel Directory
http://www.kenyacountyguide.co.ke/baringo-county-030/
http://baringo.go.ke/
https://www.education.go.ke/

 
Counties of Kenya